Digonophorus is a genus of beetles belonging to the  family Lucanidae. Species in the genus are found in South and South-East Asia.

References

External links 

 Digonophorus at insectoid.info
 Digonophorus at gbif.org

Lucanidae genera
Lucaninae